Tsybuliv is an urban-type settlement in central Ukraine. It is located in Uman Raion (district) of Cherkasy Oblast (province). It is in Monastyryshche urban hromada, one of the hromadas of Ukraine, the administration of which is located in the town of Monastyryshche. Population: 

Until 18 July 2020, Tsybuliv belonged to Monastyryshche Raion. The raion was abolished in July 2020 as part of the administrative reform of Ukraine, which reduced the number of raions of Cherkasy Oblast to four. The area of Monastyryshche Raion was merged into Uman Raion.

References

Urban-type settlements in Uman Raion